Anolis koopmani the Haitian brown red-bellied anole or Koopman's anole, is a species of lizard in the family Dactyloidae. The species is found in Haiti.

References

Anoles
Reptiles described in 1961
Endemic fauna of Haiti
Reptiles of Haiti